The Stones of Venice is a Big Finish Productions audio drama based on the long-running British science fiction television series Doctor Who. This audio drama was broadcast on BBC 7 in four weekly parts starting on 1 October 2005, and was repeated on the same channel beginning on 22 October 2006 and on 19 September 2007. This was Michael Sheard's final appearance in Doctor Who, before his death on 31 August 2005.

Cast
The Doctor — Paul McGann
Charley Pollard — India Fisher
Orsino, a Duke — Michael Sheard
Churchwell, a curator – Nick Scovell
Ms Lavish, an elderly lady — Elaine Ives-Cameron
Pietro, a gondolier — Barnaby Edwards
Vincenzo, a High Priest — Mark Gatiss

Notes

The names of some of this play's characters are derived from romantic works of fiction.  "Duke Orsino" is from Shakespeare's Twelfth Night, and Mrs. Lavish is from A Room with a View by E. M. Forster.
The play's name is a reference to The Stones of Venice, a collection of essays by John Ruskin from the 1850s.
Although it was the third to be released, this was the first Eighth Doctor audio drama to be recorded and therefore marked Paul McGann's return to the role for the first time since the 1996 Doctor Who TV movie and India Fisher's first performance as Charley Pollard.

Working Titles

My Last Duchess

External links
Big Finish Productions – The Stones of Venice

2001 audio plays
Eighth Doctor audio plays
Radio plays based on Doctor Who
Venice in fiction
Plays by Paul Magrs
2005 radio dramas
Works set in the 23rd century